Annop Chaipan (born July 6, 1983) is a Thai retired professional footballer who played as a defensive midfielder.

Personal life

Annop's brother Ramthep Chaipan is also a footballer as a defensive midfielder.

External links
https://us.soccerway.com/players/annop-chaipan/287415/

1983 births
Living people
Annop Chaipan
Annop Chaipan
Association football midfielders
Annop Chaipan
Annop Chaipan
Annop Chaipan
Annop Chaipan
Annop Chaipan
Annop Chaipan
Annop Chaipan
Annop Chaipan